Hughenden Airport  is an airport in Hughenden, Queensland, Australia. The airport was opened in 1963.

Airlines and destinations

See also
 List of airports in Queensland

References

External links
Hughenden Airport 

Airports in Queensland
North West Queensland
Airports established in 1963